Marcia Jean Rieke is an American astronomer. She is a Regents' Professor of Astronomy and associate department head at the University of Arizona. Rieke is the Principal Investigator on the near-infrared camera (NIRCam) for the James Webb Space Telescope (JWST). She has also served as the deputy-Principal Investigator on the Near Infrared Camera and Multi-Object Spectrometer (NICMOS) for the Hubble Space Telescope (HST), and as the co-investigator for the multiband imaging photometer on the Spitzer Space Telescope, where she also acted as an outreach coordinator and a member of the Science Working Group. Rieke was also involved with several infrared ground-based observatories, including the MMT Observatory in Arizona. She was vice chair for Program Prioritization of the Astro2010 Decadal Survey Committee, "New Worlds, New Horizons". Marcia Rieke is considered by many to be one of the "founding mothers" of infrared astronomy, along with Judith Pipher.

Early life and education
Marcia Rieke was born Marcia Keyes on June 13, 1951, in Hillsdale, Michigan. Rieke and her family soon after moved to Midland, Michigan where she attended elementary, middle and high school. The presence of the Dow Chemical Company headquarters in Midland made science a topic of importance for kids throughout the school system. She graduated from Midland High School (Midland, Michigan) in 1969.

Rieke studied at the Massachusetts Institute of Technology where she earned her bachelor's degree in 1972 and her Ph.D. in 1976, both in physics.

Career and research
After receiving her degrees from MIT, Rieke became a postdoctoral fellow at the University of Arizona in 1976, and has remained there ever since, now as Regents' Professor of Astronomy and formerly as Associate Department Head for Steward Observatory. Her scientific research interests include infrared observations of galactic nuclei and galaxies in the early universe (high-redshift galaxies).

In 2007, Rieke was elected a fellow of the American Academy of Arts and Sciences.

In 2012, Rieke was elected to the National Academy of Sciences.

She was elected a Legacy Fellow of the American Astronomical Society in 2020.

Honors and awards
NASA Exceptional Public Service Medal (2014)
 Robert H. Goddard Award for Achievement in Science (2014)
 Lyman Spitzer Lecturer, Princeton University (2014)
 University of Arizona Galileo Circle Fellow (2006)
 Mortar Board Senior Honor Society (1995)
 National Science Foundation Faculty Award for Women (1992-1996)
George Van Biesbroeck Prize (1980)

Personal life
Marcia Rieke is married to the infrared astronomer George H. Rieke.

References 

1951 births
Living people
People from Tucson, Arizona
People from Hillsdale, Michigan
University of Arizona faculty
American women astronomers
MIT Department of Physics alumni
Fellows of the American Academy of Arts and Sciences
Members of the United States National Academy of Sciences
Fellows of the American Astronomical Society